{{DISPLAYTITLE:C13H25N9O3}}
The molecular formula C13H25N9O3 (molar mass: 355.403 g/mol, exact mass: 355.2080 u) may refer to:

 TAN-1057_A
 TAN-1057_C

Molecular formulas